Qaleh Shahid (also Romanized as Qal‘eh Shahīd; also known as Qal‘eh-i-Khān, Qal‘eh Khān, and Qal‘eh-ye Khān) is a village in Posht Rud Rural District, in the Central District of Narmashir County, Kerman Province, Iran. At the 2006 census, its population was 1,911, in 462 families.

References 

Populated places in Narmashir County